Guilhad Emilio Schenker (born 2 October 1980) is an Israeli filmmaker, television producer and the CEO of Tadmor Entertainment.

Biography
Schenker was born in Caracas, Venezuela. Since 1994, he took up various roles in the Israeli television industry.

During his military service, he served as a producer for the IDF radio station Galei Zahal and won the producer of the year award in 2000. After completing his service, he pursued to different roles across Keshet Media Group, Reshet and Channel 13 News.
He later returned to Galei Zahal and acted as the IDF radio’s chief creative officer for six more years until 2013. Between 2014-2018, he served as the senior vice president at the Zappa Group, a media and music company.
In 2018 he was appointed as the CEO of Tadmor Entertainment.
 He was the artistic director of the Tel Aviv Jazz Festival.

He achieved both his Bachelor’s and Master’s degrees from the Steve Tisch School of Film and Television at Tel Aviv University. He is a Berlinale Talents graduate of the Berlin International Film Festival and was a scholar at the German bursary program of the Nordrhein-Westfalen's government.

Between 2013-2018, Schenker hosted the television show Living in a Movie, which was broadcast on the Israeli Educational Television Network. The program comprises 170 interviews with prominent Israeli filmmakers. He lectured at the Herzliya Interdisciplinary Center and the Rimon School of Jazz and Contemporary Music.

Filmography
During his academic studies, Schenker directed three 25-minute short films: Shum, The Rebels and Shats - all of which participated in film festivals around the world.

Schenker’s final project at Tel Aviv University was a 28-minute short film called Lavan which was produced by the Rabinovich Foundation. The film was inspired by a form of sensory deprivation known as White torture. 

It tells the story of a prisoner who is incarcerated naked in a plain white room with a blank backdrop and only fed white food in order to drive him insane. It starred Razia Israeli, Sigal Rosh and Tomer Ben David and was shortlisted at the Oscars’ short film category. 

The movie was directed by Schenker and co-written by him, alongside Yossi Meiri. Meiri also acted as the film’s DOP and was awarded the best cinematography prize at the ÉCU The European Independent Film Festival in Paris.

Lavan won 12 awards and was acquired for television broadcast in ten countries.

In 2017, Schenker directed his first feature film, Madam Yankelova's Fine Literature Club, which was also co-written by Meiri. It starred Keren Mor, Hana Laszlo, Ania Bukstein, Yiftach Klein and Lea Koenig - in the titular role as Madam Yankelova. The film was nominated for six Ophir Awards  and won two: Best Costume Design and Best Makeup.

It participated in film festivals across the world
and was sold to HBO Europe.

References

External links

 Frank Scheck (20 June 2019). A women's literary club has a secret murderous agenda in Israeli director Guilhad Emilio Schenker's darkly comic horror film. The Hollywood Reporter
 Tom Brook (25 February 2016). Israeli cinema: From conflict to fantasy. BBC
"Living in a Movie". You Tube
 

1980 births
Israeli film directors
Israeli male screenwriters
Israeli LGBT screenwriters
Living people
Film people from Tel Aviv
Secular Jews
Tel Aviv University alumni
Venezuelan emigrants to Israel